is an essay on death penalty dating before its abolition in France, co-signed by two writers Albert Camus and Arthur Kœstler. It is an examination of human condition from the existentialism perspective.

Contents 
The book composed of three parts:
 "" by Arthur Koestler, translated from the English "Reflections on Hanging"
 "" by Albert Camus
 "", an introduction by Jean Bloch-Michel

References 

1957 essays
Literary collaborations
Essays by Albert Camus
Works by Arthur Koestler
French essays
Existentialism
Works about capital punishment